Prolypha is a genus of parasitic flies in the family Tachinidae. There is one described species in Prolypha, P. palmarum.

References

Notes

 
 
 
 

Tachinidae
Monotypic Brachycera genera
Articles created by Qbugbot